Robert K. Cunningham is an American computer scientist and engineer. In 2021 he became Vice Chancellor for Research Infrastructure at the University of Pittsburgh. He is a fellow of the Institute of Electrical and Electronics Engineers.

Education 
He earned an Sc.B. in Electrical Engineering from Brown University, which he attended from 1981-1985. He studied visual processes as well as artificial intelligence in the former Department of Cognitive and Neural Systems of Boston University, where he earned his Ph.D.

Career 
He worked for twenty-five years at the MIT Lincoln Laboratory, principally on computer security. From 2018 to 2021 he worked on quantum computing at the Software Engineering Institute of Carnegie Mellon University. He was director of the Laboratory of Physical Science at the University of Maryland (2019–2020).  

In 2021, he became Vice Chancellor for Research Infrastructure at the University of Pittsburgh, while maintaining connections to Carnegie Mellon University.

He was made a fellow of the Institute of Electrical and Electronics Engineers in 2007. He has served as chair of the IEEE Cybersecurity Initiative.

According to Scopus he has an h-index of 13.

Personal life 
He is married to Barbara Shinn-Cunningham.

References 

Year of birth missing (living people)
Living people
American computer scientists
Brown University alumni
Boston University alumni